Dead Letter Office is a rarities and B-sides collection by R.E.M., released in April 1987. The album is essentially a collection of many additional recordings R.E.M. made from before Murmur to Lifes Rich Pageant that were outtakes or released as B-sides to their singles internationally. Many of the tracks are favorite cover versions indicating the band's disparate influences and musical tastes, including three Velvet Underground covers, and songs by  Aerosmith ("Toys in the Attic"), Roger Miller ("King of the Road"), and fellow Athenians Pylon ("Crazy").

Guitarist Peter Buck composed wry, self-deprecating (and, in one instance, apologetic) liner notes to the songs on the album. Buck initially had doubts about releasing it, saying he felt as though people would perceive the album as the band "trying to cash in, maybe to sell some records", as the ultimate release date predated that of the band's final studio album with I.R.S., Document, by a mere four months.

The album was initially issued as a 15-song collection on vinyl and cassette, but when its CD edition appeared the five tracks from the band's 1982 Chronic Town EP were added. This was the only CD availability of Chronic Town until the release of The Originals box set.

Track listing
All songs written by Bill Berry, Peter Buck, Mike Mills and Michael Stipe except where noted.

Post side
"Crazy" (Randy Bewley, Vanessa Briscoe, Curtis Crowe, Michael Lachowski) – 3:03 B-side of "Driver 8" 7-inch single and "Wendell Gee" 7 and 12-inch singles
"There She Goes Again" (Lou Reed) – 2:50 B-side of I.R.S. "Radio Free Europe" 7-inch single
"Burning Down" – 4:12 B-side of "Wendell Gee" 7 and 12-inch singles
"Voice of Harold"1 – 4:24 B-side of "So. Central Rain" 12-inch single
"Burning Hell" – 3:49 B-side of "Cant Get There from Here" 12-inch single
"White Tornado" – 1:55 Recorded on the same day as the "Radio Free Europe" single in 1981, B-side of "Superman" 7 & 12-inch single
"Toys in the Attic" (Steven Tyler, Joe Perry) – 2:28 B-side of "Fall on Me" 12-inch singles

Script side

 "Windout" (Jeremy Ayers, Berry, Buck, Mills, Stipe) – 1:58 from Bachelor Party soundtrack
"Ages of You" – 3:42 B-side of "Wendell Gee" 7 and 12-inch singles
"Pale Blue Eyes" (Reed) – 2:53 B-side of "So. Central Rain" 12-inch single
"Rotary Ten" – 2:00 B-side of "Fall on Me" 7-inch single
"Bandwagon" (Berry, Buck, Mills, Lynda Stipe, M. Stipe) – 2:16 B-side of "Cant Get There from Here" 7 and 12-inch singles
"Femme Fatale" (Reed) – 2:49 B-side of "Superman" 12-inch single
"Walters Theme"2 – 1:32 B-side of "So. Central Rain" 7-inch single
"King of the Road"2 (Roger Miller) – 3:13 B-side of "So. Central Rain" 7-inch single
CD bonus tracks (Chronic Town EP)
 "Wolves, Lower" – 4:10
"Gardening at Night" – 3:29
"Carnival of Sorts (Box Cars)" – 3:54
"1,000,000" – 3:06
"Stumble" – 5:40

The IRS Years reissue
On January 26, 1993, EMI (which owns the I.R.S. catalogue) re-released Dead Letter Office in Europe with two bonus tracks:
"Gardening at Night" (acoustic version) – 3:53
"All the Right Friends"3 – 3:53

Notes
 Features the backing track of "7 Chinese Bros." (from Reckoning) with Stipe's singing the liner notes from the back cover of a gospel album The Joy of Knowing Jesus by The Revelaires.
 Buck says "Walter's Theme" and "King of the Road" were recorded extemporaneously during a recording session while the band was drunk. The songs were recorded at the end of a tryout session with Elliot Mazer in 1983 before the recording of Reckoning. In "Walter's Theme", Stipe refers to the Pere Ubu song "Lonesome Cowboy Dave" ("I got a hat the size of Oklahoma!"); "King of the Road" consists mostly of Stipe's fumbling through the lyrics ("I'm a man, a man by no means") as Buck and Mills try to arrive at the same key (both can be heard yelling chord names at each other).
 Studio outtake, as listed on And I Feel Fine... The Best of the I.R.S. Years 1982–1987.

Charts

Weekly charts

Single

See also
 Athens, GA: Inside Out (1987), archive footage

References

External links

Albums produced by Joe Boyd
Albums produced by Don Gehman
Albums produced by Don Dixon (musician)
Albums produced by Mitch Easter
B-side compilation albums
Albums produced by Bill Berry
Albums produced by Mike Mills
Albums produced by Peter Buck
Albums produced by Michael Stipe
R.E.M. compilation albums
1987 compilation albums
I.R.S. Records compilation albums